Rajinder Singh Institute Ground is a multi purpose stadium in Bangalore, Karnataka. The ground is mainly used for organizing matches of football, cricket and other sports. The stadium has hosted nine Ranji Trophy matches  from 1964 when Karnataka cricket team played against Kerala cricket team until 2008.

The stadium has hosted six List A matches  in 1996 when Karnataka cricket team played against Kerala cricket team  until 2012 but since then the stadium has hosted non-first-class matches.

References

External links 
 Cricketarchive
 Cricinfo
 RSI

Cricket grounds in Karnataka
Sports venues in Bangalore
Sports venues completed in 1994
1994 establishments in Karnataka
20th-century architecture in India